Parker Road station is a DART Light Rail station in Plano, Texas. It is located at the intersection of Park Boulevard and Archerwood Street near US 75 (Central Expressway). It was originally called East Plano Transit Center before the light rail station opened up. The  terminates some trains at Parker Road during peak hours for direct service to DFW Airport station.

History
In July 2011, it was announced that Parker Road station along with the North Carrollton / Frankford station on the Green Line and the Northwest Plano Park & Ride would be part of a pilot program that charged passengers from non-DART cities for parking. However, on April 3, 2014 DART eliminated the program (due to costs), but at Parker Road, cars with permits (passengers in a DART city) would have a few reserved lots, and the other lots were free for anyone to park.

References

External links
 DART - Parker Road Station

Dallas Area Rapid Transit light rail stations
Railway stations in the United States opened in 2002
2002 establishments in Texas
Railway stations in Collin County, Texas
Transportation in Plano, Texas